À cause des garçons may refer to:

À cause des Garçons (band), a French duo formed by Hélène Bérard and Laurence Heller
 À cause des Garçons (album), the album by the eponymous band
"À cause des garçons" (song) a song by the eponymous band and by Yelle